"Morning Girl" is a 1969 song by Neon Philharmonic. It was a hit in Canada and the United States. The recording featured a chamber-sized orchestra of Nashville Symphony Orchestra musicians, and the project was headed by composer Tupper Saussy and vocalist Don Gant.

The song reached number 17 on the US Billboard Hot 100 during the spring of the year.  It peaked at number 15 on the Cash Box Top 100. It was a bigger hit in Canada, where it hit number 6 on the RPM 100, and number 2 on RPMs Adult Contemporary chart.

Charts

Shaun Cassidy cover

In 1976, Shaun Cassidy covered "Morning Girl."  It was his first single, and the track was included on his debut album, Shaun Cassidy. It saw release in Germany, reaching number 40.

Other cover versions
The Lettermen, in 1971.  Their version reached number 34 on the U.S. Adult Contemporary chart.

In 1969, Brazilian singer Ronnie Von released a Portuguese rendition on his album A Misteriosa Luta do Reino de Parassempre Contra o Império de Nuncamais.

Pink Lady performed a Japanese-language take on the song for their 1978 live album America! America! America!.

In 2017, Filipino singer and actor, Daniel Padilla released his version on Star Records.

References

External links
 Lyrics of this song
 
 

1969 songs
1969 singles
1971 singles
1976 debut singles
Shaun Cassidy songs
Warner Records singles
Song recordings produced by Michael Lloyd
The Lettermen songs